Farzi is a 2023 Indian Hindi-language black comedy crime thriller television series about counterfeit money created, produced and directed by Raj & DK, who also co-wrote the series with Sita Menon and Suman Kumar. It stars Shahid Kapoor, Vijay Sethupathi, Kay Kay Menon, Raashii Khanna and Bhuvan Arora. The series shares continuity with Raj & DK's spy series The Family Man.

Initially conceived as a film in 2014, Farzi was expanded into a television series by 2019. Principal photography began in Mumbai in July 2021. Filming also took place in Alibaug, Goa, Nepal, and Jordan. Sachin–Jigar and Tanishk Bagchi composed the songs, while Ketan Sodha provided the score. The eight-episode series was released on Amazon Prime Video on 10 February 2023. The series received critical acclaim , with particular praise for the cinematography, and performances of Kapoor, Sethupathi, Menon, and Arora.

Premise 
Farzi is about Sunny, an artist disillusioned by the income inequality in India after failing to keep his grandfather's revolutionary printing press in business. He decides to team with his best friend Firoz to make counterfeit money. They face challenges from Mansoor, a gangster, and Michael, a cop.

Cast and characters

Main 
Shahid Kapoor as Sandeep alias Sunny aka 'Artist', a disillusioned artist
Vijay Sethupathi as Michael Vedanayagam, a Special Task Force officer and head of the Counterfeiting & Currency Fraud Analysis & Research Team (CCFART)
Kay Kay Menon as Mansoor Dalal, a criminal mastermind who heads the counterfeit network in India, based out of Jordan
Raashii Khanna as Megha Vyas, an officer for the Reserve Bank of India, who later joins CCFART
Bhuvan Arora as Firoz, Sunny's best friend and partner
Chittaranjan Giri as Yasir, an employee at Kranti Patrika
Zakir Hussain as Finance Minister Pawan Gahlot
Jaswant Singh Dalal as Shekhar Ahlawat, a member of CCFART
Amol Palekar as Madhav, Sunny's grandfather and owner of Kranti Patrika
Kubbra Sait as Saira, Mansoor's superior
Regina Cassandra as Rekha Rao, Michael's ex-wife

Recurring 
Kavya Thapar as Ananya, Sunny's ex-girlfriend
Chittaranjan Tripathy as Michael's divorce lawyer
Vijay Kumar as Jitu Kaka, Mansoor's uncle and manager
Saqib Ayub as Anees, Sunny and Firoz's friend and a small-time goon
Karan Maan as Commander Murtaza
Nilesh Divekar as Bilal, Mansoor's henchman
Priyadarshini Indalkar as the receptionist at MKG Publishing
Akkshay Gunaawat as Suparn
Saurav Chakraborty as Jamal, Mansoor's henchman
Mrinmayee Godbole as Rekha's divorce lawyer
Armaan Bhanushali as young Sunny
Kabir Khan as young Firoz
Vivek Madaan as Arjun Nayar
Govind Pandey as MLA Kesaribhai Doshi
Divyam Shukla as Vyom, Rekha and Michael's son
Ashutosh Priyadarshi as Titu Khislu, a Bangladeshi smuggler
Anna Ador as Svetalana

Cameos 
The following actors make cameos, reprising their roles from The Family Man:
Uday Mahesh as Chellam
Ajay Jadhav as Sub-Inspector Shinde
Manoj Bajpayee as Srikant Tiwari (voice only)

Episodes

Production 
Farzi was first conceived as a film by Raj & DK with Shahid Kapoor and Nawazuddin Siddiqui in 2014. Kriti Sanon joined the cast by the end of the year. By 2019, it was expanded into a television series with Kapoor still attached. In January 2021, Kapoor confirmed that Raashii Khanna had joined the project. In September 2021, Bhuvan Arora said that he was working on the series. Raj & DK offered a part to Vijay Sethupathi when they were in Chennai filming The Family Man; he joined the production 40 days after they began filming. He credited his co-star Raashi Khanna, with whom he had worked before in Tamil films, for making him comfortable on set. 

Principal photography began at Film City, Mumbai in July 2021. Filming also took place in Goa, Alibaug, Nepal, and Jordan. Pankaj Kumar served as the cinematographer.

The series was officially announced by Amazon on 28 April 2022, during the launch exhibit of 40 Indian projects sanctioned by the company. Kapoor, Sethupathi, Khanna, Kay Kay Menon, Regina Cassandra, Zakir Hussain, Bhuvan Arora, Amol Palekar, and Kubbra Sait were all announced to star.

Soundtrack

The duo Sachin–Jigar, who are frequent collaborators of Raj & DK, composed music for the series. They composed two songs, "Paisa Hai Toh" and "Sab Farzi". Tanishk Bagchi composed the third song, "Aasmaan". A soundtrack album comprising these three songs was released by Sony Music India on 28 January 2023.

Release
The trailer of Farzi was released on 13 January 2023. The series was released on Amazon Prime Video on 10 February 2023.

Reception

Saibal Chatterjee of NDTV wrote that "thanks to a gripping storyline, the uniformly-paced series sustains its momentum within the individual chapters and across all its eight parts", and praised the performances of Shahid Kapoor, Vijay Sethupathi and Kay Kay Menon. Shubhra Gupta of The Indian Express concluded that the "inimitable Vijay Sethupathi livens up show that is in service to its star Shahid Kapoor, not its plot". Anuj Kumar of The Hindu also compared it unfavourably to The Family Man, writing that the "socio-political commentary that was seamless in The Family Man gets repetitive and even jarring at times here". He also expressed displeasure with how "the writers have spent hours in explaining the business of counterfeit currency, but have left the nuts and bolts of the story loose", but found Kapoor and Sethupathi's performances to be "splendid".

Deepa Gahlot of Rediff.com was appreciative of the performances of Sethupathi and Menon; she found certain episodes to be "adrenaline-pumping" but found others "yawn-inducing". ThePrint Nidhima Taneja termed it a "gripping crime thriller" and found Bhuvan Arora's to the "breakout performance" of the series. Shweta Keshri of India Today wrote that "Farzi is an intriguing watch, but with too much detailing, it tends to get exhausting in parts". She added that "Kapoor has knocked it out of the park this time", termed Sethupati "remarkable", and Menon "top class". Scroll.in Nandini Ramnath opined that "the show’s strengths include a well-chosen cast, strong individual moments, and dialogue destined to endure as memes". She was particularly impressed by Pankaj Kumar's cinematography, which she said "includes several continuous takes to create momentum and one bravura – and hilarious – chase sequence set in a crippling Mumbai traffic jam".

Pratikshya Mishra of The Quint termed it a "sly, gripping thriller" and added that "the camerawork and editing work hand-in-hand to create a nearly mesmerising experience, mimicking the hypnotic nature of greed, fame, and power". Sowmya Rajendran found similarities between Farzi and Raj & DK's other series The Family Man; she labelled it a "mostly engrossing crime drama" and found Kapoor "likeable as the anti-hero". Dishya Sharma of News18 found Farzi to be "binge-worthy" but not "as great as The Family Man"; she picked up the performances, cinematography and music as the series' highlights. Ronak Kotecha of The Times of India opined that Farzi "is a refreshing and intensely gripping scamster saga whose pros far outweigh its cons"

References

External links 

 Farzi on Amazon Prime Video
 Farzi at Bollywood Hungama

Indian television series
Amazon Prime Video original programming
Indian crime television series
2023 Indian television series debuts
Indian crime drama television series
Television shows set in Mumbai